Cor Gillis (born 31 March 1989) is a Belgian association football player who currently plays for KVK Ninove.

Career
Coming from the Anderlecht youth squad, Cor Gillis started his professional career in the 2006–2007 season for the Belgian champions. He suffered an injury in his debut for the team and had to return in the next season with only 1 cap.

Altogether he has made around 1900 minutes of play for the Belgian Champs in the Belgian league. He also starred in the UEFA Cup.

Gillis made a substitute appearance of 1 minute against Bayern in the UEFA Cup last year.

In 2008, Cor didn't even have a contract at Anderlecht, he was there simply as a youth player who sometimes trained with the first squad, although he was a member of their reserve team. He was hoping for some playing minutes in the Belgian cup, but never played as Anderlecht bought a new defender.

Then went from R.S.C. Anderlecht to K.V. Mechelen on 27 January 2009.

International
The 2007–2008 season saw him make more appearances with Anderlecht and make his way into the Belgian U-17s (now in the Belgian U-20s). He later made another 9 appearances, gaining 14 caps in the 2007/2008 season.

This season, he has made another 10 caps, making his total appearances up to a total over 25.

Cor Gillis was the captain for the Belgians U-17 and was regarded as a great prospect then, but now it looks he is passed by numerous other Belgian talents.

References

External links
 

1989 births
Living people
Belgian footballers
Association football defenders
R.S.C. Anderlecht players
People from Anderlecht
K.V. Mechelen players
A.F.C. Tubize players
F.C.V. Dender E.H. players
MVV Maastricht players
Challenger Pro League players
Eerste Divisie players
K.S.K. Heist players
Sint-Eloois-Winkel Sport players
Belgian expatriate footballers
Expatriate footballers in the Netherlands
Belgian expatriate sportspeople in the Netherlands
Footballers from Brussels